Rubina Khalid is a Pakistani politician who has been a Member of the Senate of Pakistan, since March 2012. She is currently the Chairperson of the Senate Committee on Information Technology & Telecommunications.

Education
She has done Bachelor of Laws from Khyber Law College, Peshawar.

Political career
She was elected to the Senate of Pakistan as a candidate of Pakistan Peoples Party (PPP) from Khyber Pakhtunkhwa in 2012 Pakistani Senate election.

She was re-elected to the Senate as a candidate of PPP on reserved seat for women from Khyber Pakhtunkhwa in 2018 Pakistani Senate election.  She took oath as Senator on 12 March 2018.

References

Living people
Pakistani senators (14th Parliament)
Pakistan People's Party politicians
Year of birth missing (living people)